Harry Wakefield Ince (9 April 1893 - 11 May 1978) was a Barbadian cricketer who represented West Indies in matches before they attained Test match status.

Education
Ince attended Harrison College in Bridgetown, Barbados, from which many prominent batsmen emerged in this period.

Career
Ince first played for Barbados in 1913 against the touring Marylebone Cricket Club; he scored 56 on his first-class debut and 57 not out in his second game. Shortly afterwards, he was chosen to play for a representative West Indies team against the MCC and scored 167, his first century in first-class cricket. After the First World War, Ince continued to represent Barbados, scoring centuries in 1920 and 1922, and he was subsequently selected to tour England with the West Indies team in 1923.

In first-class matches that season in England, Ince scored 381 runs at an average of 16.56 with a highest score of 46. After the tour, there were rumours that Ince had argued with the captain of the team. His remaining first-class matches were played for Barbados, but he only passed fifty once more, and played his last match in 1930.

Ince was a fast-scoring batsman who played a range of strokes, and was enormously popular with spectators because of his stylish batting. Some experts considered him to be comparable in style to the famous English batsman Frank Woolley.

Historical assessment
In his book on schools' cricket in colonial Barbados, Keith Sandiford suggests that Ince was the best Barbadian left-handed batsman before the Second World War. Although Ince was unsuccessful in England, his batting average over 18 years for Barbados was 47.12. Late into his career, Ince continued to be highly successful batting in Barbados club cricket.

References

Bibliography

1893 births
1978 deaths
Pre-1928 West Indies cricketers
Barbadian cricketers
People from Christ Church, Barbados
Barbados cricketers
People educated at Harrison College (Barbados)